Don't Look Now is a 1936 Warner Bros. Merrie Melodies animated short film directed by Tex Avery. The short was released on November 7, 1936.

Plot
It portrays Valentine's Day. Cupid is making people fall in love, while Satan is doing everything possible to undermine the relationships.

Notes
The original BR ending is lost due to the LaserDisc release of the dubbed version. It does not survive through CN Latin America, meaning that the original print may be lost forever if WB doesn't restore the original negative.
The original titles have been found in an eBay auction in 2007, but it is unknown if they will be acquired for future releases.

References

External links
 

Merrie Melodies short films
Warner Bros. Cartoons animated short films
Films directed by Tex Avery
1936 animated films
1936 films
1930s Warner Bros. animated short films